Dhuys-et-Morin-en-Brie is a commune in the Aisne department of northern France. The municipality was established on 1 January 2016 and consists of the former communes of Artonges, La Celle-sous-Montmirail, Fontenelle-en-Brie and Marchais-en-Brie.

See also 
Communes of the Aisne department

References 

Communes of Aisne
Communes nouvelles of Aisne
Populated places established in 2016

2016 establishments in France